Pelutava (formerly) is a village in Kėdainiai district municipality, in Kaunas County, in central Lithuania. According to the 2011 census, the village had a population of 179 people. There is a library.

History
Pelutava has been known since 1590. At the 18th century it was a royal village in Vilkija eldership. During the Soviet era Pelutava was the "Salomėja Nėris" kolkhoz center.

Demography

References

Villages in Kaunas County
Kėdainiai District Municipality